Jesus Hits Like the Atom Bomb is the third studio album by American rock band Tripping Daisy, released on July 7, 1998, through Island Records. It was the band's first album with guitarist Phillip Karnats and drummer Benjamin Curtis, and was the band's last album released during guitarist Wes Berggren's lifetime. Produced by Eric Drew Feldman and the band, Jesus Hits Like the Atom Bomb was a stylistic departure from the band's previous work, and showcased a more artistic yet abrasive sound underpinned by pop sensibilities. The album also features a significant amount of experimentation with the album's guitars, vocals and instrumentation.  

A few months prior to the release of Jesus Hits Like the Atom Bomb, Island Records' parent company was involved in a major corporate merger, which negatively impacted the album's promotional campaign. It subsequently failed to meet sales expectations, with neither the album or its singles charting, resulting in Tripping Daisy being dropped by Island Records two months after its release. Despite this, Jesus Hits Like the Atom Bomb was released to mostly positive reviews from critics, who praised its greatly improved songwriting and psychedelic sound; some hailed the album as a stylistic breakthrough for Tripping Daisy. It is now regarded as the band's best work, and has also been viewed as a precursor to Tim DeLaughter's next project, The Polyphonic Spree.

Background 
In June 1995, Tripping Daisy issued their second album I Am an Elastic Firecracker. Backed by the hit single "I Got a Girl", the album was an moderate commercial success, reaching number 95 on the band's native Billboard 200 chart, and also appeared on several other charts worldwide. However, the band faced numerous difficulties during this period; after a national tour of the United States, drummer Bryan Wakeland left the band in February 1996 due to creative differences. He was replaced by Mitch Marine, who performed with the band during a less-than-well received supporting tour with Def Leppard throughout 1996; however, he would prove to be an "even worse [musical] partnership" than Wakeland. Furthermore, album sales were not as high as the band and Island Records hoped, which had stalled at 300,000 copies by 1998. 

Exhausted and burnt out from touring for six and a half years straight, Tripping Daisy went on a extended hiatus for most of 1997, and nearly split up for good. The band's frontman, Tim DeLaughter, had also become increasingly unhappy and disillusioned with the music industry, and resented what he perceived to be Island's manipulation of Tripping Daisy, who he felt were trying to change their focus away from their music and more towards album and singles sales. However, after experiencing a spiritual awakening telling him he "was capable of doing anything [he] had envisioned", he returned to writing new material for Tripping Daisy. Whilst working on music, DeLaughter met guitarist and trumpeter Phillip Karnats; the two connected musically, and began working on a side project called the Platinum Experience, featuring DeLaughter on drums and Karnats on guitar. Tripping Daisy guitarist Wes Berggen later joined the Platinum Experience playing keyboards, and later on, all three members were playing guitar with each other. Karnats was soon asked to join Tripping Daisy for a tour of Texas in the summer of 1997, and June of that year, he was made an official member of the band, expanding Tripping Daisy into a quintet.

Recording and production 
Prior to the recording of Jesus Hits Like the Atom Bomb, Tripping Daisy sent a demo tape of their new material to producer and PJ Harvey collaborator Eric Drew Feldman. Tim DeLaughter became interested in working with Feldman after hearing his work producing Deus's In a Bar, Under the Sea (1996); "Sounds I heard on the Deus record were part of a world we wanted to be able to play in." Although they did not expect him to respond, Feldman agreed to produce the band's next album.

On October 7, 1997, on the day the band were scheduled to head out to Dreamland Recording Studios in Hurley, New York, the band fired Mitch Marine. "Mitch's drums were loaded up in the trailer and we were getting ready to leave... But we just couldn't go and make a record with a group of people who weren't right," DeLaughter opined. The band commenced recording at Dreamland with Feldman and I Am an Elastic Firecracker engineer Andy Baker on October 10, 1997. After spending two weeks recording at the studio without a drummer, the band reached out to UFOFU drummer Benjamin Curtis, and asked him to play drums on the record. Curtis arrived at Dreamland on October 19, 1997, and immediately started laying down drum tracks for the album's partially completed songs upon his arrival. Although he was skeptical of them at first, Curtis immediately connected with the rest of the band, and they started writing material together. Curtis found the experience recording with Tripping Daisy to be "really positive" and "a relief" following UFOFU's acrimonious breakup that year, and on November 4, 1997, he was made a permanent member of the band. Tripping Daisy collectively wrote and recorded around 20 songs for Jesus Hits Like the Atom Bomb at Dreamland, 14 of which were included on the final album.  

Feldman offered Tripping Daisy an unprecedented amount of creative freedom during the recording of Jesus Hits Like the Atom Bomb , and encouraged the band to try out new ideas in the studio. "He likes to experiment and then go into the experiment even further, and before you know it, you're crafting [an innovative] record", DeLaughter reflected; "His whole thing was, 'Just make sure I have plenty of tape so you can do anything you want to and there's no pressure.' " Feldman also insisted that recordings that contained mistakes and missed notes were to be left as is, often responding to the band's requests to redo takes with "No way. That’s awesome.” The band's also deliberately interfered with Wes Berggen's guitar knobs and timing whilst he was recording takes to create " 'anything goes' noise"; later on, the band integrated the noise recordings into the album's tracks, giving the album a raw, "scruffy and unpredictable" mix.

Island Records did not interfere with the recording sessions of Jesus Hits Like the Atom Bomb. Previously, during the recording of I Am an Elastic Firecracker, A&R representatives at Island had pressured Tripping Daisy to produce more commercial-sounding material, likely in response to the lacklustre performance of the label's re-release of the band's debut album Bill in 1993, which was expected to be an immediate success. DeLaughter attributed Island's lack of interference to the departures of A&R executive Rose Noone and Island Records founder Chris Blackwell in 1996 and 1997, respectively. "We had nobody from the record company disturbing us," DeLaughter recalled; "It was bascially, 'Here's the money, make a record, we won't bug you.' We were a victim of circumstances that out in our favor. It's the only way to make a record: no one to fuck with you. There was no second-guessing."

Recording completed on December 18, 1997, with the band returning to Texas just before Christmas. Thereafter, Feldman and Baker mixed the album at Compass Point Studios in The Bahamas in January 1998. The band was extremely proud of the album, with bassist Mark Pirro calling it "the best we've been so far", and DeLaughter believed he had "finally made a record and been a part of something that [he'd] wanted to achieve for a long time".

Composition 
Jesus Hits Like the Atom Bomb has been described as alternative rock, art rock and neo-psychedelia. The Austin Chronicle labelled the album "space pop", whilst Allmusic described it as "[balancing] punk-pop with art-rock". A departure from the grunge-oriented sound found on Tripping Daisy's previous releases Bill and I Am an Elastic Firecracker, the album embraces a variety of musical styles while displaying pop music influences throughout, and its sound was compared to artists such as Jane's Addiction, Built to Spill, the Butthole Surfers and The Flaming Lips, as well as to The Beatles' Sergeant Pepper's Lonely Hearts Club Band (1967). 

DeLaughter envisioned Jesus Hits Like the Atom Bomb to be an artistic statement that challenged, and rejected, modern-day radio, which he saw as "formulated and predictable", and the pressures from Island the band had faced with I Am an Elastic Firecracker.  He also considered Jesus Hits Like the Atom Bomb to be "the most honest record coming out in the last few years", and believed that the album's openly flawed nature gave it a quality of "truth". Island's then-CEO, Davitt Sigerson, described Jesus Hits Like the Atom Bomb as "more epic and more emotionally connecting" than Tripping Daisy's previous works.

"Waited a Light Year" was described by FMQB as "an adventurous pocket symphony" that "uses three distinctly different musical movements that culminate in a blinding wall of noise." "Sonic Bloom" is a psychedelic pop ballad about "the joy and wide-eyed amazement of finding, falling and feeling love." Some of the album's tracks exhibit a punk rock influence; "Mechanical Breakdown" is a "neo-futuristic" pop-punk anthem, whilst "8 Ladies" features off-kilter post-punk riffs in the vein of Shudder to Think. "Our Drive to the Sun / Can a Man Mark It?" and "Tiny Men" harken back to the band's early melodic sound found on Bill. The album's final track "Indian Poker Pt. 2 & 3" is a combined cover of the songs "Indian Poker (Part 2)" and "Indian Poker (Part 3)" by the indie rock band Brainiac, from their album Hissing Prigs in Static Couture (1996). The track was dedicated to Brainiac's lead singer Timmy Taylor, who was killed in a run-off road car crash in May 1997, in the album's liner notes. 

A variety of keyboard instruments make an appearance throughout the album, including Korg synthesizers, a Wurlitzer organ, a Yamaha CP-70, an organ that belonged to DeLaughters' mother-in-law, and an Ace Tone organ. Other instruments played throughout the album include a xylophone, a mellotron, a cello, and trumpets courtesy of Phillip Karnats. 

Tim DeLaughter's lyrics were described as dense and often cryptic, with Pitchfork describing the lyrics as "[coming] straight off of Robert Pollard's Guided By Voices lyricpad", and his vocal performances were compared to that of The Flaming Lips' lead singer Wayne Coyne. In several songs, he applies reverb and distortion effects to his vocals, drawing comparisons to Brainiac. DeLaughter was also permitted by Feldman to apply extensive overdubbing and harmonization to his and his bandmates' vocals, in an attempt to create more melody; he had attempted to do this on Tripping Daisy's previous albums, but the previous producers he worked with thought it was annoying. The album's vocal harmonies were compared to those of The Beach Boys.

Tim DeLaughter derived the album's title from a greatest hits record by the Pilgrim Travelers he found in the studio. "One of the songs on there was 'Jesus Hits Like The Atom Bomb'. Something went through me like a bolt of lightening, and we were all saying, 'That's It! That says everything we're feeling about this record.' " DeLaughter also chose the album title on the basis that it "meant something as broad as my thoughts, to embrace this record that I thought was heavy." The album was originally titled Guts, but was changed after it was discovered that fellow Island Records artist John Cale had released a compilation album under that name in 1977, much to the band's dismay.

Release and promotion 
Executives at Island Records responded enthusiastically to Jesus Hits Like the Atom Bomb when presented with the album. "When we brought this record in to them, they were completely flabbergasted — floored! We played it for him, for Davitt [Sigerson], and he was like, 'My God! We had no idea you were doing this.' " Speaking to the Dallas Observer shortly before the album's release, Sigerson predicted that the album would be able to sell at least 500,000 copies in the United States, and possibly sell one million copies by the end of 1998 and go Platinum. Even if the album's sales did not meet his expectations, he stated that he was not worried about the album's commercial performance. "If this record were to sell fewer copies [than 500,000], I wouldn't say I was wrong about it. I can't have remorse about it. It won't make me love it any less." Island hoped to promote Tripping Daisy and Jesus Hits Like the Atom Bomb with a "born-again marketing push", designed to help build up the band's credibility and create a new fanbase; this included giving DeLaughter thousands of dollars to produce a film about the album, which was ultimately never made. The band also managed to obtain greater control over the album's publicity by going through the New York-based Kathy Schenker Associates, instead of through Island's in-house publicists. Tripping Daisy did not take any touring advances from Island, in order to reduce their liabilities with the label.

Jesus Hits Like the Atom Bomb was released in the United States and Canada on July 7, 1998, with a release in the United Kingdom following on July 27. Island wanted to issue "Sonic Bloom" as the album's first single, but the band rejected this and insisted on releasing "Waited a Light Year" instead; the label issued the single to radio stations on June 22, 1998. The choice to release the song as a single was seen as a risky move for the band, due to its six-minute runtime (although a four-minute radio edit was also provided) and the fact that there were more accessible songs on the album; DeLaughter stated that the choice to release the single was done as a rejection of mainstream radio, and to dissuade listeners from perceiving Tripping Daisy as one-hit wonders (due to "I Got a Girl"). As part of the album's promotional push in the United Kingdom, Island organised a free giveaway of a limited edition 7" single of "Waited a Light Year", featuring the song on the A-side and an etching of the album's artwork on the reverse, through Kerrang! magazine; between August 1 and August 6, 1998, readers could write to a mailing address to receive the single, which was limited to 1,000 copies. The single was not warmly received by radio stations. "Sonic Bloom", was later issued as the album's second single sometime in September 1998. A music video for the song was due to be filmed in November 1998, but was cancelled. Neither the album or it singles managed to chart, and sales were poor. "We felt like we were doing something special", DeLaughter lamented to the Houston Chronicle in 2017, "But it just disappeared. It was dead on arrival."

Around a month or so before the album's release, Island's parent company, PolyGram, was purchased by the beverage giant Seagram for US$10.6 billion. In order to finance the acquisition and cut costs, Seagram decided to merge PolyGram into Universal Music Group, resulting in 3,000 PolyGram jobs being lost. DeLaughter believed that those working at Island Records at the time were more concerned about keeping their jobs, and thus the album was not, and could not, be promoted effectively. In September 1998, two months after the album's release, Island opted to not renew their contract with Tripping Daisy and dropped the band from the label. 

Tripping Daisy embarked on a short national tour in support of Jesus Hits Like the Atom Bomb from September to November 1998. Due to the studio-based nature of the songs, the band had some difficulties translating the album's material over to live shows. The band played to significantly smaller audiences during the tour; a Chicago Tribune review of one of the band's shows on September 23, 1998, noted that only 200 people had come to see the band's show at The Metro Chicago, which was reported to have a maximum capacity of 1,400. Another review by The GW Hatchet of a show at The Black Cat in Washington, D.C. around this time reported an audience of only forty people. After the tour's conclusion, the band returned to the studio to commence work on a new extended play, The Tops Off Our Head.

Reception 

Upon its release, Jesus Hits Like the Atom Bomb received mostly positive reviews from critics. Stephen Thomas Erlewine of AllMusic hailed the album as "a big stylistic breakthrough [for Tripping Daisy], enhancing the psychedelic subtext that ran through their first two records, retaining their melodic sensibility and jacking up their weirdness quotient", and praised the contributions of Feldman. Similarly, Ryan Schreiber of Pitchfork described the album "a collection of songs that are at once melodically intricate and insanely catchy", and praised the band's maturity, writing, "Gone are the days of the saccharine, abrasive cuteness the band exploited on I Am An Elastic Firecracker and with it, any hope of being lumped alongside Deadeye Dick." Vue Weekly 's T.C. Shaw found "simply no duds" on the album and praised Tripping Daisy for avoiding "mock profundity", before concluding that the band were "master tunesmiths who not only understand the absurd but the surreal as well." RPM's Rod Gudino opined that the album "live[d] up to both sides of its name, namely, energy and spirituality", and noted the influence of Phillip Karnats, who he believed gave the album "added firepower" and "a fifth dimension [...] to experiment" with. 

While viewing the album positively overall, Jenny Eliscu of CMJ New Music Monthly remarked that Tripping Daisy's experimentation on the album was akin to "a kid with its first chemistry kit", producing songs of varying quality; "sometimes it creates a fascinating new concoction; other times the different parts just neutralize each other and what's left is an inchoate mess." The Lancashire Telegraph found there to be "patches of corporate rockstodge" amidst the album's "engaging hotch-potch of weird and wonderful oddities". Paul Brannigan of Kerrang! lauded the album as a "collection of wildly imaginative tunes" featuring "gorgeously over-blown prog-punk symphonies stuffied with angelic harmonies and bright-eyed guitars", although he noted that the album "occasionally deviate[d] from the 'Inspirational Pop' category into the jagged pastures of 'Art Wank Hell'." Among the more negative reviews, Jamie Kiffel of Lollipop Magazine dismissed Jesus Hits Like the Atom Bomb  as "an over-extended length of meandering, mushy guitar noise, reams of moody organ use, strings of wrangly guitars, miles of dead air, bump-in-the-road halting vocals, and a tunnelful [sic] of tin can reverb". Michael Bertin of The Austin Chronicle believed that Jesus Hits Like the Atom Bomb had come three years too late to save the band's reputation, and felt that there were "barely a handful of keepers scattered across the entirety of [the album]".

Legacy 
Despite its commercial failure, Jesus Hits Like the Atom Bomb was "one of the most acclaimed albums of 1998", according to MTV News. The album has since become a critical and fan favourite, and is generally regarded as Tripping Daisy's best. In November 2003, CMJ New Music Report awarded the album a "Silver Saulte", signifying it was a "classic College Radio album". The Dallas Observer called Jesus Hits Like the Atom Bomb "the greatest record of [Tripping Daisy]'s career" in July 2011, and later ranked "Sonic Bloom", at number 100 on their "100 Best Texas Songs" list in August 2012, praising the track as "more heartfelt than anything they'd done before".

Jesus Hits Like the Atom Bomb has been retrospectively viewed as a precursor to Tim DeLaughter's future endeavours with the choral rock band The Polyphonic Spree, which he formed following Tripping Daisy's disbandment in 1999. "If I look at why I liked effects on my vocals [on Jesus Hits Like the Atom Bomb], it's because I always wanted to sound like there was more than just myself singing," DeLaughter recounted to MTV News in 2003; "I could glide on the melody a lot better. So when I was going through that at the time, I wished there were 10 of me, 10 voices singing as one. I thought, 'Wouldn't it be great to have a band like that?' " Likewise,  CMJ's Doug Levy observed that throughout Jesus Hits Like the Atom Bomb, "you can actually hear the Polyphonic Spree being born in DeLaughter's head".

Jesus Hits Like the Atom Bomb remained out of print until November 2020, when it was reissued on double vinyl for the first time through the band's own record label, Good Records, which was formed shortly after the band was dropped from Island. The band had originally planned to release the album on vinyl around the time of its release, but was delayed indefinitely due to the UMG-PolyGram merger, and then cancelled.

Track listing

Personnel 
Personnel per liner notes.Tripping Daisy
Tim DeLaughter - vocals, guitars, califone, dulcimer, keyboards, additional drums , art direction, artwork, collages
 Mark Pirro - bass, percussion
 Benjamin Curtis - drums, percussion, additional drums 
 Wes Berggren - guitar, Ace Tone organ, mellotron, cello
 Philip Karnats - guitar, trumpet, banjo
Additional musicians
 Julie Duncanville - backing vocals
 The Goldentones - backing vocals
 John Ganser - drums 
Artwork
 Aldo Sampieri - art consultant
 Joshua Kessler - photography
Production
 Eric Drew Feldman - producer, mixing, additional keyboards, additional bass, additional drums 
 Andy Baker - engineering, mixing
 Suzanne Kappa - engineer assistant 
 Oswald "Wiz" Bowie - engineering assistant 
 Howie Weinberg - mastering 
Management
 Eric Ferris - management
 Julie A. Doyle - management
 Erik Courson - webmaster
Additional personnel
 Michael Dodds - song title

Release history

References

External links 

 Jesus Hits Like the Atom Bomb on YouTube (streamed copy where licensed)

1998 albums
Tripping Daisy albums
Island Records albums